Henry Radford Ashby (1875 – 1926) was an English footballer who played in the Football League for Burton Swifts, Burton United and Leicester Fosse, and the Southern League for Plymouth Argyle. He was a full back.

Life and career
Ashby was born in Derby. He began his career with Derby Athletic and in 1896 joined Burton Swifts, where he made 88 league appearances over the next two seasons. Ashby moved on to Brighton United in 1898. He spent nearly two seasons there before the club experienced financial difficulties, released their players and were dissolved. Ashby joined Burton United in 1901, an amalgamation of the Swifts and Burton Wanderers, and played in 92 league matches over the next three seasons.

He moved to Plymouth Argyle in 1904, where he made 41 appearances in all competitions and received a Western League winners medal in his one season with the club. A club handbook describes Ashby as "a player who has had a good reputation among second leaguers for several seasons." He joined Leicester Fosse in 1905 for an £80 transfer fee. He spent two seasons with the club and made 68 appearances in all competitions before ending his playing career. Ashby died in 1926.

Honours
Western League First Division: 1904–05

References

1875 births
Footballers from Derby
English footballers
Association football defenders
Burton Swifts F.C. players
Brighton United F.C. players
Burton United F.C. players
Plymouth Argyle F.C. players
Leicester City F.C. players
English Football League players
Southern Football League players
Western Football League players
1926 deaths